Turinjapuram railway station is a railway station serving Tiruvannamalai town, primary being Tiruvannamalai railway station.

Administration 
The station falls under the jurisdiction of Tiruchirappalli railway division in Southern Railway zone of Indian Railways.

Lines 
It is on the line connecting Katpadi Junction and Viluppuram Junction.

Facilities
It is fully electrified railway station. This station has six platforms.

References

Railway stations in Thiruvannamalai district
Transport in Tiruvannamalai